Walter Renneisen (born 3 March 1940) is a German actor. After engagements at the Schauspiel Bochum, Theater Dortmund and Staatstheater Darmstadt, he has worked freelance. He founded a touring theatre company in 1977.

Career 
Born in Mainz, Renneisen grew up on a farm in Raunheim, Hesse, Germany. He played as a percussionist in a band in Frankfurt clubs. After his Abitur, he studied theatre, German and philosophy at the universities of Cologne and Mainz from 1960 to 1964. He then studied at the Westfälische Schauspielschule Bochum. After graduation, he was engaged at the Schauspiel Bochum, Theater Dortmund and Staatstheater Darmstadt, among others. In Darmstadt, he was inspired by Rudolf Sellner.

He has frequently played in TV series such as Tatort, Der Alte, Derrick, Ein Fall für zwei and Siska. His roles have included Mephisto in Goethe's Urfaust, Cyrano in Pavel Kohout's Der arme Cyrano, the title role in Brecht's Der aufhaltsame Aufstieg des Herrn Arturo Ui, and Salieri in Shaffer's Amadeus. In 1995, he began to stage his own theatre productions on tour, presenting for example Patrick Süßkind's Der Kontrabaß, Die Sternstunde des Josef Bieder and Deutschland, Deine Hessen. Renneisen has performed the play Der Kontrabaß for more than 30 years. He has spoken in more than 800 radio plays.

In 2016, he received the Rheingau Musikpreis for his life's work on stage and TV. In 2018, he appeared at the Rheingau Musik Festival in a show titled Aus dem Leben eines Taugenichts, borrowing the title of the novella by Eichendorff (in English given as Memoirs of a Good-for-Nothing) and presenting Renneisen's life including 50 years on stage, in literature and in music.

Renneisen is married, has two daughters and two sons, and lives in Bensheim. He is the maternal uncle of English actress Alex Kingston.

Awards 
Renneisen has received several awards, including:
 1985 Hörspielpreis der Kriegsblinden
 1995 Adolf-Grimme-Preis
 2004 Hessian Order of Merit
 2005 Sonderpreis of INTHEGA
 2014 Order of Merit of the Federal Republic of Germany
 2016 Rheingau Musikpreis
 2016 Ehrenspange of Bensheim

References

External links 
 
 
 ZBF Agency Cologne 
 Walter Renneisen / Ein Schauspieler, der die Hessen kennt Hessischer Rundfunk 31 October 2013 
 Der Virtuose: Walter Renneisen als "Josef Bieder" im Frankfurter Fritz Remond Theater im Zoo FAZ 19 June 2003
 Thomas Tritsch: Auszeichnung Schauspieler Walter Renneisen erhält Ehrenspange der Stadt Bensheim / Kultur-Botschafter mit Helfersyndrom morgenweb.de 23 May 2016

1940 births
Living people
German male television actors
German male stage actors
Actors from Mainz
20th-century German male actors
21st-century German male actors
Recipients of the Cross of the Order of Merit of the Federal Republic of Germany